Thal railway station was a railway station located in  Pakistan. The station served the town of Thall until it closed in 1991.

Turrets and water tanks are the main features of its architecture.

See also
 List of railway stations in Pakistan
 Pakistan Railways

References

External links

Railway stations in Hangu District, Pakistan
Railway stations on Khushalgarh–Kohat–Thal Railway
Defunct railway stations in Pakistan